This was the first edition of the tournament.

Wu Yibing won the title after defeating Ben Shelton 7–5, 6–3 in the final. He did not lose a single set in the entire tournament.

Seeds

Draw

Finals

Top half

Bottom half

References

External links
Main draw
Qualifying draw

Georgia's Rome Challenger - 1